{{Infobox Missions
|image=Mission Dolores (1165072805).jpg
|caption=The original adobe Mission San Francisco de Asís (on the left) and the Mission Dolores Basilica (on the right)
|name=Mission San Francisco de Asís
|location=320 Dolores StreetSan Francisco, California 94114
|originalname=La Misión de Nuestro Padre San Francisco
|translation=The Mission of Our Father Saint Francis of Assisi
|namesake=Saint Francis of Assisi
|nickname="Mission Dolores"Yenne, p. 64
|foundedby=Francisco Palóu; Junípero Serra
|foundingorder=Sixth
|militarydistrict=Fourth
|nativetribe=OhloneCosteño|placename=Chutchui|baptisms=6,898
|marriages=2,043
|burials=11,000= 5,000 (Europeans/Americans), 6,000 (Indians)
|secularized=1834
|returned=1857
|owner=Roman Catholic Archdiocese of San Francisco
|currentuse=Parish Church
|coordinates = 
|locmapin = United States San Francisco Central#California#USA
|map_caption = Location in Central San Francisco
|designation1=NRHP
|designation1_number=#72000251
|designation1_date=1972
|designation2=California
|designation2_offname=Site of original Mission Dolores chapel and Dolores Lagoon
|designation2_number=327-1
|designation3=San Francisco
|designation3_number=1
|designation3_date=April 11, 1968
|website=http://www.missiondolores.org
}}

Mission San Francisco de Asís, commonly known as Mission Dolores (as it was founded near the Dolores creek), is a Spanish Californian mission and the oldest surviving structure in San Francisco. Located in the Mission District, it was founded on October 9, 1776, by Padre Francisco Palóu (a companion of Junípero Serra) and co-founder Fray Pedro Benito Cambón, who had been charged with bringing Spanish settlers to Alta California and with evangelizing the local indigenous Californians, the Ohlone. The present mission building was the second structure for the site and was dedicated in 1791.

Next to the old mission is the Mission Dolores Basilica, built in 1918 in an elaborate California Churrigueresque style.  This larger church replaced a brick parish of 1876, which had been destroyed in the San Francisco earthquake of 1906.  The elaborate church was raised to the dignity of a Catholic basilica by Pope Pius XII in 1952.

History
The settlement was named for Francis of Assisi, the founder of the Franciscan Order, but was also commonly known as "Mission Dolores" owing to the presence of a nearby creek named Arroyo de Nuestra Señora de los Dolores, meaning "Our Lady of Sorrows Creek."  During the expedition of Juan Bautista de Anza, this site was identified by Pedro Font as the most suitable site for a mission in the San Francisco area.

The original mission was a small structure dedicated on October 9, 1776, after the required church documents arrived. It was located near what is today the intersection of Camp and Albion Streets (according to some sources), about a block-and-a-half east of the surviving adobe Mission building, and on the shores of the now filled Laguna de Los Dolores. A historical marker at that location depicts this lake, but whether it ever actually existed is a matter of some dispute. (Creek geologists Janet Sowers and Christopher Richard propose that the legendary lake is the result of misunderstandings of Juan Bautista de Anza's 1776 writings. According to their 2011 hydrological map, there were no lakes in the area, only creeks.)

The present mission church, near what is now the intersection of Dolores and 16th Streets, was dedicated in 1791. At the time of dedication, a mural painted by native labor adorned the focal wall of the chapel. The mission was constructed of adobe and was part of a complex of buildings used for housing, agricultural, and manufacturing enterprises (see architecture of the California missions). Though most of the mission complex, including the quadrangle and Convento, has either been altered or demolished outright during the intervening years, the façade of the mission chapel has remained relatively unchanged since its construction in 1782–1791.

According to mission historian Guire Cleary, the early 19th century saw the greatest period of activity at San Francisco de Asís:

At its peak in 1810–1820, the average Indian population at Pueblo Dolores was about 1,100 people. The California missions were not only houses of worship, but they were agricultural communities, manufacturers of all sorts of products, hotels, ranches, hospitals, schools, and the centers of the largest communities in the state. In 1810 the Mission owned 11,000 sheep, 11,000 cows, and thousands of horses, goats, pigs, and mules. Its ranching and farming operations extended as far south as San Mateo and east to Alameda. Horses were corralled on Potrero Hill, and the milking sheds for the cows were located along Dolores Creek at what is today Mission High School. Twenty looms were kept in operation to process wool into cloth. The circumference of the Mission's holdings was said to have been about 125 miles.

The mission chapel, along with "Father Serra's Church" at Mission San Juan Capistrano, is one of only two surviving buildings where Junípero Serra is known to have officiated (although "Dolores" was still under construction at the time of Serra's visit). In 1817, Mission San Rafael Arcángel was established as an Asistencia to act as a hospital for the mission, though it would later be granted full mission status in 1822. The Mexican War of Independence (1810–1821) strained relations between the Mexican government and the California missions. Supplies were scant, and the Indians who worked at the missions continued to suffer terrible losses from disease and cultural disruption (more than 5,000 Indians are thought to have been buried in the cemetery adjacent to the Mission). In 1834, the Mexican government enacted secularization laws whereby most church properties were sold or granted to private owners. In practical terms, this meant that the missions would hold title only to the churches, the residences of the priests, and a small amount of land surrounding the church for use as gardens. In the period that followed, Mission Dolores fell on very hard times. By 1842, only eight Christian Indians were living at the mission.

The California Gold Rush brought renewed activity to the Mission Dolores area. In the 1850s, two plank roads were constructed from what is today downtown San Francisco to the mission, and the entire area became a popular resort and entertainment district. Some of the mission properties were sold or leased for use as saloons and gambling halls. Racetracks were constructed, and fights between bulls and bears were staged for crowds. The mission complex also underwent alterations. Part of the Convento was converted to a two-story wooden wing for use as a seminary and priests' quarters, while another section became the  "Mansion House," a popular tavern and way station for travelers. By 1876, the Mansion House portion of the Convento had been razed and replaced with a large Gothic Revival brick church, designed to serve the growing population of immigrants who were now making the mission area their home.

During this period, wood clapboard siding was applied to the original adobe chapel walls as both a cosmetic and a protective measure; the veneer was later removed when the mission was restored. During the 1906 San Francisco earthquake, the adjacent brick church was destroyed. By contrast, the original adobe mission, though damaged, remained in relatively good condition. However, the ensuing fire touched off by the earthquake reached almost to the mission's doorstep. To prevent the spread of flames, the Convent and School of Notre Dame across the street were dynamited by firefighters; nevertheless, nearly all the blocks east of Dolores Street and north of 20th street were consumed by flames. In 1913, construction began on a new church (now known as the Mission Dolores Basilica) adjacent to the mission, which was completed in 1918. This structure was further remodeled in 1926 with churrigueresque ornamentation inspired by the Panama-California Exposition held in San Diego's Balboa Park. A sensitive restoration of the original adobe mission was undertaken in 1917 by architect Willis Polk. In 1952, San Francisco Archbishop John J. Mitty announced that Pope Pius XII had elevated Mission Dolores to the status of a minor basilica. This was the first designation of a basilica west of the Mississippi and the fifth basilica named in the United States. Today, the larger, newer church is called "Mission Dolores Basilica" while the original adobe structure retains the name of Mission Dolores. 

Other historic designations
 San Francisco Designated Landmark #1 – City & County of San Francisco
 California Historical Landmark #327-1 – site of original Mission Dolores chapel and Dolores Lagoon
 California Historical Landmark #393 – "The Hospice," an outpost of Mission Dolores founded in 1800 in San Mateo, California
 California Historical Landmark #784 – El Camino Real (the northernmost point visited by Serra)

Art

Statue of Junípero Serra

A full-length portrait sculpture of Junípero Serra is on the property of the mission. The cast stone sculpture, by Arthur Putnam, was completed in 1909, cast between 1916 and 1917, and installed in 1918 when the mission was remodeled. Funding for the piece came from D.J. McQuarry and it cost $500 to cast. It is approximately 6 ft 6 in tall. The sculpture depicts Serra wearing a Franciscan friar's robe belted at the waist with a knotted rope and a rosary around his neck. He looks down, with his head bowed and eyes downward. The sculpture is on a concrete base. It is one of a series of allegorical figures commissioned by the estate of E. W. Scripps to depict California history. In 1993 it was examined by the Smithsonian Institution's Save Outdoor Sculpture! program. The program determined that the sculpture was well maintained.

Succession of rectors, pastors, and administrators
 Francisco Palóu and Pedro Benito Cambón – June 27, 1776 (founders)
 Francisco Palóu – June 27, 1776 – 1784
 Eugene O'Connell – 1854
 Richard Carroll – 1854–1860
 John J. Prendergast – 1860–1867
 Thomas Cushing – 1867–1875
 Richard P. Brennan – 1875–1904
 Patrick Cummins – 1904–1916
 John W. Sullivan – 1916–1939
 Thomas A. Connolly  – 1939–1948 (first auxiliary bishop, first rector)
 James T. O'Dowd – 1948–1950 (rector)
 Merlin Guilfoyle, VG – 1950–1969 (rector)
 Norman F. McFarland – 1970–1974 (last rector)
 Richard S. Knapp – 1974, 1974–1983 (served first as administrator, then pastor)
 John J. O'Connor – 1983–1997
 Maurice McCormick – 1997–2003
 William J. Justice – 2003–2007 (Became a bishop after he left Mission Dolores)
 Arturo Albano – 2007– 2015
 Francis Mark P Garbo  - 2015–Present

See also

 Spanish missions in California
 List of Spanish missions in California
 San Pedro y San Pablo Asistencia
 List of San Francisco Designated Landmarks
 USNS Mission Dolores (AO-115) – a Mission Buenaventura Class fleet oiler built during World War II.
 USNS Mission San Francisco (AO-123) – a Mission Buenaventura'' Class fleet oiler built during World War II.

Notes

References

Further reading

External links

 Mission Dolores Basilica
 Mission Dolores via The Archdiocese of San Francisco
 Elevation & Site Layout sketches of the Mission proper
 Catholic San Francisco – History of Mission Dolores
 San Francisco Public Library – Photographs of Mission Dolores
 Map of Mission Dolores and nearby water sources (from ShapingSF.org)
 California Historic Plaque marking the original site of Mission Dolores at Camp and Albion Streets in SF
 Mission Dolores Neighborhood Association
 American Southwest, a National Park Service Discover Our Shared Heritage Travel Itinerary
 Early History of the California Coast, a National Park Service Discover Our Shared Heritage Travel Itinerary
 Listing, drawings, and photographs at the Historic American Buildings Survey
 Ground plan of Mission Dolores, San Francisco, Ca at The Bancroft Library
 

San Francisco de Asis
Roman Catholic churches in San Francisco
1776 in Alta California
Francisco de Asis
Mission District, San Francisco
1776 establishments in Alta California
Religious organizations established in 1776
18th-century Roman Catholic church buildings in the United States
Roman Catholic churches completed in 1791
Roman Catholic churches completed in 1918
California Historical Landmarks
Churches on the National Register of Historic Places in California
National Register of Historic Places in San Francisco
San Francisco Designated Landmarks
Roman Catholic Archdiocese of San Francisco
Roman Catholic churches in California
Tourist attractions in San Francisco
Spanish Colonial architecture in California
Spanish Colonial Revival architecture in California
Museums in San Francisco
Religious museums in California
Junípero Serra
Mission San Francisco de Asís